Vassieux may refer to:

 Vassieux-en-Vercors, a municipality in the department of Drôme, France
 Vassieux (quarter), a neighborhood in Caluire-et-Cuire, France
 Jean Vassieux (1949-2021), a former ice hockey player in the French Ice Hockey Hall of Fame